Barys Arena is a multi-purpose indoor arena located in Astana, Kazakhstan. It serves as a home arena for the Barys Astana of the Kontinental Hockey League (KHL). The arena seats 11,578 spectators for ice hockey.

See also
List of European ice hockey arenas

References

External links

Barys Astana arenas
Indoor ice hockey venues in Kazakhstan
Sports venues in Astana